Lumby is a village, with a population of 813 (1 January 2022), to the north of Odense, in Funen, Denmark.

References

Suburbs of Odense
Populated places in Funen